Titarenko (Ukrainian or Russian: Титаренко) is a gender-neutral Ukrainian surname that may refer to

 Alexey Titarenko (born 1962), Russian photographer and artist
Maria Titarenko (1917–2002), Azerbaijani Soviet opera singer
Raisa Gorbachova (née Titarenko, 1932–1999), wife of former Soviet leader Mikhail Gorbachev
 Vyacheslav Titarenko (born 1978), Kazakhstani swimmer
Yevgeny  Titarenko (born 1935), Soviet writer

See also
 

Ukrainian-language surnames